Björn Phau won the title, defeating Ruben Bemelmans in the final 6–7(4–7), 6–3, 6–4.

Defending champion Bastian Knittel lost in the second round to Ruben Bemelmans.

Seeds

Draw

Finals

Top half

Bottom half

References
 Main Draw
 Qualifying Draw

Intersport Heilbronn Open - Singles
2012 Singles